The 2020–22 MENA Tour, titled as the 2020–22 MENA Tour by Arena for sponsorship reasons, was the ninth season of the MENA Tour.

The schedule initially included 11 events to be played in February, March and April. The first 5 events were played as scheduled but the remaining 6 were postponed until later in 2020 due to the COVID-19 pandemic and later cancelled. Following the strategic alliance formed with the Asian Tour in late 2021, four additional events were held in Thailand in May 2022, co-sanctioned by the Asian Development Tour.

Schedule
The following table lists official events during the 2020–22 season.

Order of Merit
The Order of Merit was titled as the Journey to Jordan and was based on prize money won during the season, calculated using a points-based system. Arjun Gupta led the amateur Order of Merit.

Notes

References

2020 in golf
2022 in golf